Interior with an Easel, Bredgade 25 is an oil-on-canvas painted by Danish artist Vilhelm Hammershøi in 1912. Acquired by the Getty Museum in 2018, the painting depicts the artist's apartment at Bredgade 25 in Copenhagen, which was his address up to his death in 1916.

Description 
Hammershøi is renowned for his sense of minimalism and his color palettes which consist of muted neutral colors, which consist of greys, desaturated yellows, greens, etc. His minimalism is also a major component of Scandinavian design, and many of his works is representative to this aesthetic, in addition to emphasis on natural lighting.

Interior with an Easel, Bredgade 25 is one of four paintings that depicts Hammershøi's easel. There are two other variants that feature the apartment in addition with the easel. A 1910 painting of the same subject is located in Statens Museum for Kunst, which features a chair between the easel and the wall in addition to a porcelain bowl without a lid on the table visible in the back room. Another variant, which was undated features a chair but with a covered porcelain bowl in the background, was featured at a Sotheby's auction in 1975.

This variant is sparse in nature, which features the easel, a small side table half visible with one of the doors open, and a gilt

Provenance 
The painting was sold from the artist to Leonard Borwick in 1912, who was an enthusiast of Hammershøi's work.

It was then acquired from Borwick to Adam Black in 1912. Passed on by descent, it was sold at Christie's European Art Auction on 31 October 2018, where it was sold to the Getty Museum for US$5,037,500, making it the most expensive Danish art piece, which initially had an estimate of $1.5–2.0 million. The museum purchased it through Jack Kilgore & Co.

Getty Museum Director Timothy Potts stated: "We are delighted to be able to add this extraordinary work by one of the most important Scandinavian artists of the late 19th and early 20th centuries to our collection." and "Hammershøi clearly saw himself in the tradition of old master painters (he is often touted as ‘the modern Vermeer’), and I am sure visitors will see many resonances with  paintings by other great northern European artists, such as Caspar David Friedrich, Edvard Munch."

References 

Paintings by Vilhelm Hammershøi
1900s in Denmark
Paintings in the collection of the J. Paul Getty Museum
1912 paintings